The Anglesea Football Netball Club  is an Australian rules football and netball club situated in the township of Anglesea, near the city of Geelong in Victoria. 

The club plays its home games at
Ellimatta Oval, Anglesea, and competes in the Bellarine Football League, an Australian rules competition established in 1971 in the Bellarine Peninsula region of Victoria.

History 
Anglesea Football Club was established in 1963. It is now known as the "Kangaroos". Before the founding of the club local players from Anglesea played for Freshwater Creek.

The Anglesea Football Club played the 1963 and 1964 season for the Geelong & District Football League Jarman Cup. The club only won one game in 1963 and lost all games in 1964. Anglesea was promoted to the Woolworths Cup in 1965 when the Jarman Cup became a reserve grade competition for first division clubs. The club played for this cup until the end of 1969.

In 1970, Anglesea and St Bernards were both demoted to GDFL Woolworths Cup Reserves. Both teams made the grand final with St Bernards winning 13.15 (93) to 6.12 (48). Both clubs were promoted back into the senior competition and Anglesea transferred to the Bellarine District Football League in 1973.

The club has a winning rate of 49.7%.

Premierships 
Bellarine Football League (3): 1983, 1991, 1999

Notable VFL/AFL players 
Ian Lewtas - 
Patrick Dangerfield - , 
 James Gowans - 
 Dyson Bell-Warren (Geelong VFL)
 Stu Mackenzie (Frontman of rock band King Gizzard and the Lizard Wizard)

Bibliography
 Cat Country: History of Football in the Geelong Region by John Stoward – Aussie Footy Books, 2008 –

References

External links
 

Bellarine Football League
Australian rules football clubs in Victoria (Australia)
Sports clubs established in 1963
Australian rules football clubs established in 1963
1963 establishments in Australia
Netball teams in Victoria (Australia)